Alan Everard Montgomery CMG (born 11 March 1938) is a retired British diplomat.

He was Ambassador to the Philippines from 1992 to 1995, and High Commissioner to Tanzania from 1995 to 1998.  He was an Associate Member of the General Medical Council from 2009 to 2012.

He is the son of Philip Napier Montgomery and Honor Violet Coleman (née Price).  He was educated at the Royal Grammar School, Guildford, and Birkbeck College, London (B.A. Hons., Ph.D.).

Honors 
: Grand Cross of the Order of Sikatuna, Rank of Datu (May 18, 1995)

References

British diplomats
Living people
Companions of the Order of St Michael and St George
People educated at Royal Grammar School, Guildford
Alumni of Birkbeck, University of London
1938 births